Victoria Carroll (or Victoria Carrol-Bell; born Mary Carol Lee Ford on January 21, 1941) is an American actress and artist. Best known as Marie Massey in Alice (1978-1984).

Early life
Born Mary Carol Lee Ford on January 21, 1941 in Los Angeles, California, the third child of Oscar Ford, a vaudeville actor turned publicity agent and Lillian Ford, an actress. During the late 1940s, the whole family (along with her two older brothers) performed together on stage with their daughter as "The World's Youngest Mind Reader".

Career

Early career
Shortly after finishing high school, she began supporting herself as a painter with an art scholarship but also took several dance classes. This led to an audition for Don Arden, who hired her to dance in his play. Mary Carol Lee started working professionally as a dancer in Broadway shows.

Film career
By 1964, her dancing career had plunged into films. George Cukor had been so impressed by her that, apart from her dancing part in My Fair Lady, he gave her a minor role as a Magpie in the race scene with Rex Harrison and Audrey Hepburn. She acquired an agent and also changed her name to Victoria Carroll because there already were actresses named Mary Ford and Carol Lee Ford registered in the SAG.

Despite her part in a highly praised and successful film, Carroll had small roles in films throughout the 1960s:  a part in the chorus in Robin and the 7 Hoods,  the dance girl playing Lady Godiva in The Art of Love,  the shoeshine girl in How to Stuff a Wild Bikini,  the woman presenting Elvis Presley's character with his trophy in Spinout,  the girl who is mistaken for a spy by Marty Allen's character in The Last of the Secret Agents?, dance hall girl in The Fastest Guitar Alive,  and crime boss Earl Veasey's girlfriend in The Road Hustlers. In 1969, she played the go-go dancer Carissa in the horror film Nightmare in Wax.

Her film work briefly continued in the mid-1970s with roles in Gemini Affair, Hustle, The Kentucky Fried Movie, The Billion Dollar Hobo, The Lucifer Complex, and Pandemonium.

Television career
Carroll has made appearances on TV shows from 1960s-present. In 1964, she played a nurse on McHale's Navy. In 1965 she appeared on The Jack Benny Program as Miss Collins. In 1967, she had a small role on The Beverly Hillbillies. In 1968–1970, she appeared as six different characters on six episodes of Hogan's Heroes. Carroll played Nina Sue on an episode of The Waltons in 1981. In 1982, she played Dottie in an episode of Dynasty, and in 1982–83, she made several appearances on Gimme a Break and more.
She was Mel's girlfriend, Marie Massey on Alice (1978–1984). She also played "The Newlywed Wife" on "Death of A Few Salesmen" on "Sledge Hammer."

The Groundlings
In 1974, Victoria Carroll became one of the first actors to join The Groundlings (formerly known as "The Gary Austin Workshop"), a newly formed acting/comedy troupe 

Up until that point of her career she hadn't really shown her comedic skills. Very soon that changed as she played a variety of characters in her seven years with the improv team, such as blond bimbo author Lureen Sue Franchot. She recalls "I just really concentrated on doing comedy. [...] For me, my career began with The Groundlings. When I am asked about all this early stuff, my memory is sort of hazy."

Voice work
Carroll has also worked extensively as a voice actress. Among her voice-over roles in cartoons are:

Artist
She is also an accomplished artist under the pen name Victoria K. Bell. Carroll specializes in paintings covering the "Nostalgic Era".

In 2010, her work was featured as part of the Diverse Expression at The Universal Art Gallery. It was met with an overwhelmingly positive response.

Personal life
Carroll married fellow voice actor Michael Bell in 1984. They have a daughter, Ashley Bell, who is also an actress.

References

External links

Victoria Carroll at The Colony Theatre

1941 births
Living people
Actresses from Los Angeles
American film actresses
American stage actresses
American television actresses
American voice actresses
20th-century American actresses
21st-century American actresses
20th-century American women artists
21st-century American women artists